Pueyo may refer to:

People
 David Muñoz Pueyo (born 1997), Spanish football player
 Joaquim Pueyo (born 1950), French politician
 José Villanova Pueyo (1909-?), Spanish boxer
 María José Pueyo (born 1970), Spanish marathon runner
 Ricardo Pueyo (born 1967), Spanish racewalker
 Úrsula Pueyo (born 1983), Spanish skier

Places
 El Pueyo de Araguás, Huesca, Aragon, Spain
 Pueyo de Santa Cruz de Santa Cruz, municipality located in the province of Huesca, Aragon, Spain
 Pueyo, Navarre, town located in the province and autonomous community of Navarre, northern Spain

See also
 Banca Pueyo, a traditional Spanish bank